Edmond-Joseph Béliard, known as Édouard (24 November 1832, Paris – 28 November 1912, Étampes) was a French Impressionist painter.

Life and work 
He was born in Paris as the son of an architect, and began his professional career as a legal assistant and secretary to Alphonse Esquiros. Later, he took painting lessons with Léon Cogniet and Ernest Hébert, where he came under the influence of Jean-Baptiste Corot.  After spending some time in Rome, he had his first exhibit at the Salon in 1867, and lived in London from 1870 to 1872.

After his return to Paris, he became associated with the group of young Impressionists who gathered around Edgar Degas and became a close friend of Camille Pissarro, who he met at the Café Guerbois. It was there that he made the acquaintance of Émile Zola and may have provided some inspiration for one of Zola's recurring characters; the painter Gagnière.

In 1874, he helped prepare for the first major Impressionist exhibition, where he held a retrospective of his works. He also participated in their second exhibition, focusing on landscapes but, as the years progressed, he turned away from pure Impressionism and introduced more elements of Realism into his work.

He spent his last years in the commune of Étampes, where he served as mayor from 1892 to 1900. A street there is named after him.

References

Further reading 
 Gérald Schurr and Pierre Cabanne, Dictionnaire des petits maîtres de la peinture 1820-1920, Editions de l'Amateur, 2014

External links 
 
Béliard; le peintre qui devint maire. by Thomas Galley @ La Bauge Literaire.
Une découverte : Béliard, Les bords de l’Oise by Thomas Galley @ La Bauge Literaire.
 Corpus Étampois Le Moulin de Chauffour.

1835 births
1912 deaths
Impressionism
19th-century French painters
19th-century French male artists
French male painters
20th-century French painters
20th-century French male artists
Painters from Paris